is a former Japanese football player. He played for Japan national team.

Club career
Tsubota was born in Nagasaki Prefecture on January 23, 1956. After graduating from Hosei University, he joined Yanmar Diesel in 1979. The club won the league champions in 1981. The club also won 1983 and 1984 JSL Cup. He retired in 1992. He played 170 games in the league.

National team career
On March 8, 1981, Tsubota debuted for Japan national team against South Korea. In 1983 and 1984, he played at 1984 Summer Olympics qualification. He played 7 games for Japan until 1984.

National team statistics

References

External links

Japan National Football Team Database

1956 births
Living people
Hosei University alumni
Association football people from Nagasaki Prefecture
Japanese footballers
Japan international footballers
Japan Soccer League players
Cerezo Osaka players
Association football goalkeepers